Angus William Jake Imrie (born 2 August 1994) is a British actor. He is known for playing the character Josh Archer in BBC Radio 4's long-running drama serial The Archers. In 2014, he won the casting agency Spotlight's Most Promising Actor Award at The Sunday Timess National Student Drama Festival. The son of the actors Celia Imrie and Benjamin Whitrow, he made his screen debut in the BBC film drama Station Jim, at the age of five.

Early life and education
Imrie was born on 2 August 1994 on the Isle of Wight, the son of actors Celia Imrie and Benjamin Whitrow.

From 2001 to 2012, Imrie was educated at Dulwich College, a boarding and day independent school for boys in the south London suburb of Dulwich, followed by the University of Warwick, where he studied English Literature and Theatre Studies. From 2015 to 2017, he studied at the London Academy of Music and Dramatic Art (LAMDA) in London.

Career
Imrie has appeared in a range of stage, television and radio productions since he was a child. After his screen debut in the BBC One film drama Station Jim at the age of five, he appeared in the ITV drama series Kingdom in 2007, and the BBC One mini-series Restless in 2012. In the same year, he appeared in the BBC Two drama series The Hollow Crown, whilst in the following year, he appeared in the BBC One series Father Brown. Prior to attending LAMDA (2015–2017), he appeared at Shakespeare's Globe in London, playing Bagot in William Shakespeare's play Richard II (1595) and Ned Spiggett in Jessica Swale's play Nell Gwynn (2015). He has also appeared in a range of radio productions, including The Treasure Seekers, Charles Dickens' Great Expectations and John Mortimer's A Voyage Round My Father.

In 2014, Imrie joined the cast of the long-running BBC Radio 4 series The Archers, based on a rural farming community in the fictional village of Ambridge, to take the role of Josh Archer previously played by child actor Cian Cheesbrough, the teenage son of David and Ruth and one of the main members of the Archer family. In the same year, he played the part of cabin boy Pip in The White Whale at Leeds Dock, in which he sang Amazing Grace from the top of the set after having fallen into the water.

In 2019, Imrie co-starred in the Joe Cornish–directed The Kid Who Would Be King as the young Merlin, with Patrick Stewart portraying Merlin's older self. He also starred in the independent feature Pond Life alongside Esmé Creed-Miles; the film was produced by Dominic Dromgoole, who is the former artistic director of the Globe. Since 2021, Imrie has voiced the character Zero, a main character on the Paramount+/Nickelodeon animated series Star Trek: Prodigy.

Personal life 
Imrie resides in Oxford. His first child was born in 2018.

Filmography

Television

Film

Video games

Theatre

Theatre at LAMDA (2015–2017)

Rehearsed readings

Radio

References

External links

1994 births
Living people
Alumni of the London Academy of Music and Dramatic Art
Alumni of the University of Warwick
English male film actors
English male radio actors
English male stage actors
English male television actors
English people of Scottish descent
People educated at Dulwich College
21st-century English male actors